Yaśodharā was the wife of Prince Siddhartha — until he left his home to become a śramaṇa— the mother of Rāhula, and the sister of Devadatta. She later became a Buddhist Nun and is considered an arahatā.

Life

Yaśodharā was the daughter of King Suppabuddha, and Amita. She was born on same day in the month of Vaishaka as prince Siddhartha. Her grandfather was Añjana a Koliya chief, her father was Suppabuddha and her mother, Amitā, came from a Shakya family. The Shakya and the Koliya were branches of the Ādicca (Sanskrit: Aditya) or Ikshvaku dynasty. There were no other families considered equal to them in the region and therefore members of these two royal families married only among themselves. 

She was wedded to the Shakya prince Siddhartha, when they were both 16. At the age of 29, she gave birth to their only child, a boy named Rāhula. On the night of his birth, the prince left the palace. Yaśodharā was devastated and overcome with grief.  Once prince Siddhartha left his home at night for enlightenment, the next day, everyone was surprised by the absence of the prince. The famous Indian Hindi poet Maithili Sharan Gupt (1886–1964) tried to gather the emotions of Yaśodharā in his poem:

Oh dear, if he would have told me,

Would he still have found me a roadblock?

He gave me lot of respect,

But did he recognize my existence in true sense?

I recognized him,

If he had this thought in his heart

Oh dear, if he would have told me. (Translated by Gurmeet Kaur)

Later, when she realised that he had left, Yaśodharā decided to lead a simple life. Although relatives sent her messages to say that they would maintain her, she did not take up those offers. Several princes sought her hand but she rejected the proposals. Throughout his six-year absence, Princess Yaśodharā followed the news of his actions closely .

When the Buddha visited Kapilavastu after enlightenment, Yaśodharā did not go to see her former husband but asked Rāhula to go to the Buddha to seek inheritance. For herself, she thought: "Surely if I have gained any virtue at all the Lord will come to my presence." In order to fulfill her wish, Buddha came into her presence and admired her patience and sacrifice. King Suddhodana told Buddha how his daughter-in-law, Yasodhara, had spent her life in grief, without her husband.

Some time after her son Rāhula became a monk, Yaśodharā also entered the Order of Monks and Nuns and within time attained the state of an arhat. She was ordained as bhikkhuni with the five hundred women following Mahapajapati Gotami that first established the bhikkhuni order. She died at 78, two years before Buddha's parinirvana (death).

Legends

Waiting in the city of Paduma for Dīpankara Buddha, he tries to buy flowers as an offering but soon learns that the king already bought all the flowers for his own offering. Yet, as Dipankara is approaching, Sumedha spots a girl named Sumithra (or Bhadra) holding seven lotus flowers in her hands. He speaks to her with the intention of buying one of her flowers, but she recognises at once his potential and offers him five of the lotuses if he would promise that they would become husband and wife in all their next existences.

In the thirteenth chapter of the Lotus Sutra, Yaśodharā receives a prediction of future buddhahood from Gautama Buddha as does Mahapajapati.

Names
The meaning of the name Yaśodhara (Sanskrit) [from yaśas "glory, splendour" + dhara "bearing" from the verbal root dhri "to bear, support"] is Bearer of glory.  The names she has been called besides Yaśodharā are: Yaśodharā Theri (doyenne Yaśodharā), Bimbādevī, Bhaddakaccānā and Rāhulamātā (mother of Rahula).  In the Pali Canon, the name Yaśodharā is not found; there are two references to Bhaddakaccānā.

Several other names are identified as wives of the Buddha in different Buddhist traditions, including Gopā or Gopī, Mṛgajā, and Manodharā; according to the Mulasarvastivada Vinaya and several other sources, the Buddha in fact had three wives, and a Jataka story quoted by Nagarjuna specifies two. Thomas Rhys Davids offered the interpretation that the Buddha had a single wife who acquired various titles and epithets over the years, eventually leading to the creation of origin stories for multiple wives. Noel Peri was the first scholar to treat the issue at length, examining the Chinese and Tibetan sources as well as the Pali. He observed that early sources (translated before the 5th Century) seemed to consistently identify the Buddha's wife as 'Gopī', and that after a period of inconsistency 'Yaśodhara' emerged as the favored name for texts translated in the latter half of the 5th Century and later. In addition to Rhys David's theory, he suggests other interpretations that included the possibility of multiple marriages, which in some cases better fit with the different variations in stories of the Buddha's life, suggesting that these inconsistencies emerged when multiple distinct stories were combined into a single narrative. He also suggested that the preference in later interpretations for a single wife may reflect an accommodation of changing social mores that preferred monogamy over other forms of traditional marriage.

See also 

 Thero
 Padmasambhava
 Women in Buddhism
 Mahapajapati Gotami
 Suddhodana
 Gautama Buddha
 Sundari Nanda
 Nanda

Notes

References

The Buddha and His Teaching, Nārada, Buddhist Missionary Society, Kuala Lumpur, Malaysia, 1988,

Literature
 'Yasodhara and the Buddha,' Author: Vanessa R. Sasson, Bloomsbury Press, 2021, 
The First Buddhist Women: Translations and Commentaries on the Therigatha Author: Susan Murcott, 
Life of Princess Yashodara: Wife and Disciple of the Lord Buddha Devee, Sunity (Author) and Bhuban Mohen Murkerjie (Illustrator), Kessinger Publishing, 2003 (Reprint of the original 1929 edition),  (13),  (10), online: . Retrieved 21 September 2020.
Yashodhara: Six Seasons Without You, by Subhash Jaireth, Wild Peony Press, Broadway, NSW, Australia, 2003, 
Stars at Dawn: Forgotten Stories of Women in the Buddha's Life, Author: Wendy Garling, Shambhala Publications 2016,

External links
A Mysterious Being: The Wife of Buddha by Professor Andre Bareau, Université de France (Translated by Kyra Pahlen), the apparent source being a series of three articles published as Recherches sur la biographie du Buddha, Presses de l'École française d'extrême-orient, 1963, 1970 & 1971. (archived 2011)
Dipankara meets Sumitta and Sumedha (archived 2011)
Mahásammata (archived 2012)
The Life of Princess Yashodara: Wife and Disciple of the Lord Buddha
Cover 1929
Immediate Family of the Buddha, 4. Yaśodhara by Radhika Abeysekera
Theri (500s-200s BCE) Other Women's Voices (archived 2011)

Foremost disciples of Gautama Buddha
Family of Gautama Buddha
Arhats
Indian Buddhist nuns